Anuradha Sawhney was the ex- Chief Functionary and the head of Indian operations of People for the Ethical Treatment of Animals (PETA), India. She is an animal rights activist and was the Editor of the Indian edition of the animal rights magazine Animal Times.

Anuradha's work with PETA
She took care of the media relations and management, including all communications related to Animal Rights and Welfare in India both within the country and to global press. She was also in charge of legal, research and reporting of animal rights and welfare in India

Early life
Anuradha grew up in Bokaro, where she attended school at the St Xavier's convent as well as at Sophia College, Bombay. While there she fed the various hungry animals she encountered. She also cared for various neglected and mistreated animals including a calf that had been left to die on a roadside.

Further work with PETA India
She takes every opportunity to speak about animal rights. Her work with PETA widely varies from working with such celebrities as Raveena Tandon, Madhavan, Celina Jaitley, and Shilpa Shetty, to going undercover to investigate cruelty and rescuing abused animals, to appearing in newspapers around the globe. Named as one of Femina magazine's "50 Most Powerful Women", she has received many honours, including a 2009 Women's Achiever award.

Veganism
She was not raised as a vegan, but she became one once she realised how animals suffer in the food industry. She believes that "Billions of intensively-raised animals will end up on dinner tables this year alone. They are made of flesh, blood and bone and can feel love, happiness, loneliness and fear just like dogs and cats. Yet because they were born chickens or pigs or cows, these animals are denied everything that is natural to them. Chickens spend their brief lives in crowded conditions; many of them are so cramped that they can't even turn around or spread a wing. Most do not get a breath of fresh air until they are prodded and crammed onto lorries for a nightmarish ride to the abattoir. Hung upside-down, their throats are sliced open, often while they are still alive."

She was part of PETA India's vegetarian campaign, which teaches about the benefits of a vegan lifestyle.

Campaigns
To document the cruelty of poultry farms, PETA India conducted an undercover investigation into the husbandry, slaughter and transport conditions of chickens. A report of their findings was sent to every Animal Husbandry Department in the country to ensure that appropriate steps are taken to maintain humane standards at poultry farms.
A similar undercover investigation by PETA India into the dairy industry revealed a shocking story of filth and abuse where animals are treated like milk-producing machines and denied their most basic desires. Cows were found chained by their necks in narrow stalls, unable to stretch or move. Newborn calves were separated from their mothers and tied by their necks with ropes so short that they often strangle themselves in desperate attempts to reach their mothers.
PETA India also supports an international campaign protesting Kentucky Fried Chicken's (KFC) treatment of animals. Various KFC outlet in India were protested, with protesters demanding that KFC adopt even the minimal humane standards recommended by their own animal welfare committee.
PETA India's efforts to promote vegetarianism have gotten quite a boost from celebrity supporters. Model and actor Aditi Govitrikar, Anil Kumble, Mahima Chaudhary, Devang Patel, Madhavan, who willing was crammed in a cage to show people how chickens suffer and Channel V mascot Professor Simpoo.

Achievements
Under Anuradha's leadership, PETA India emerged as the foremost animal rights organisation in India, that has also been recognised by the Limca Book of Records in 2 consecutive editions. PETA was invited to join the Food and Agricultural Divisional Committee of the BIS, PETA has framed 11 vivisection standards for the BIS and the transport and circus standards framed by PETA have already been approved and passed by the BIS, PETA joined the slaughterhouse sectional committee and submitted a revised slaughterhouse code, PETA has suggested amendments to the Prevention of Cruelty to Animals act and rules and is now a special Invitee to the Legal Sub Committee of the Animal Welfare Board of India. She has actively participated to fight for freeing of animals from the Indian leather industry (which led to an international boycott of Indian leather by over 40 companies), milk industry and chicken industry. PETA India has rescue of over 100 animals, including lions and tigers amongst others, from circuses and zoos across the country and their placement in rescue centres. She has been supportive of the banning the entry of ? into the city of Mumbai and its neighbouring districts with 16 other states following suit and passing similar legislation.

When she has been the Chief Functionary, PETA India has received the following awards

 Red Swastik Award 2008
 Salaam Award 2008
 Nakul Award 2008
 IVC Award 2008
 Chakrvyuh award by Lalarajpatrai Institute of Management 2007
 Exuberance award 2006 by SIES College
 Indira Award 2005

The following are awards that she has personally received for her achievements in the animal rights movement.

 Women's achievement award, 2009
 Ranked as one of India's 50 most powerful women by Femina magazine
 Regarded as the leading authority by national and international media where animal rights and welfare issues for India are concerned.
 Co-opted as a member of the Animal Welfare Board of India for Maharashtra.

See also
 List of animal rights advocates

References

Living people
People for the Ethical Treatment of Animals personnel
Animal welfare and rights in India
Sophia College for Women alumni
Indian magazine editors
Indian animal rights activists
Indian editors
Indian veganism activists
Indian women editors
Women magazine editors
Year of birth missing (living people)